Merceline is a feminine given name. Notable people with the name include:

 Merceline Dahl-Regis, Bahamian physician and public health expert
 Merceline Wayodi (born 1995), Kenyan footballer

See also
 Madeleine (name)

Feminine given names